The common fat-tailed mouse opossum (Thylamys pusillus) is a species of opossum in the family Didelphidae. It occurs in Argentina, Bolivia, Brazil, and Paraguay in chaco and Andean foothill habitats. Its head-and-body length is about 75 to 120 (mean 94.3) mm, and its tail length is about 90 to 134 (mean 103.6) mm. Its dorsal fur is brownish gray, and its ventral fur is yellowish to white. The legs and cheeks are the same color as the ventral surface. Its tail is sharply bicolored (divided into two colors). A ring of faintly darker fur surrounds each eye. Its tail often lacks fat deposits, but does not always.

References

Opossums
Marsupials of South America
Marsupials of Argentina
Mammals of Bolivia
Mammals of Uruguay
Mammals described in 1804
Taxonomy articles created by Polbot